Bonavigo is a comune (municipality) in the Province of Verona in the Italian region Veneto, located about  west of Venice and about  southeast of Verona.

The municipality of Bonavigo contains the frazioni (subdivisions, mainly villages and hamlets) Bonavigo and Orti e Pilastro.

Bonavigo borders the following municipalities: Albaredo d'Adige, Angiari, Legnago, Minerbe, Roverchiara, and Veronella.

Demographic evolution

Twin towns
Bonavigo is twinned with:

  Ober-Hilbersheim, Germany

References

External links
 www.comune.bonavigo.vr.it/

Cities and towns in Veneto